The Love Affair is a 2015 Filipino drama film starring Richard Gomez, Dawn Zulueta and Bea Alonzo. It was written by Vanessa R. Valdez and directed by Nuel C. Naval. It was released on August 12, 2015, by Star Cinema.

According to Box Office Mojo, the movie earned  domestically after 4 weeks of showing. The film received mixed reviews from critics but received favorable reception at the box-office, earning  worldwide and is the second Filipino film to break the  mark for 2015, second to Crazy Beautiful You.

Plot 
Vince (Richard Gomez) and Trisha (Dawn Zulueta) are a married couple. Vince wants his marriage annulled after he finds out his wife is having an affair. He consults advice from a lawyer named Adie (Bea Alonzo) who is dealing with a similar situation as well. Stumbling from their own forefront and heartaches, the three will succumb to an unusual affair in the crossroads of their lives and regain strength from their downfalls. Will Vince and Trisha ever rekindle a broken flame? And will Adie have the chance to get up again?

Cast

Main cast 
 Richard Gomez as Vince Ramos
 Dawn Zulueta as  Patricia "Trisha" Ramos
 Bea Alonzo as Atty. Adrianne "Adie" Valiente

Supporting cast 
 Tonton Gutierrez as Greg
 Tom Rodriguez as Ryan Singson
 Victor Silayan as Noah Castillo
 Al Tantay as Pancho Valiente
 Ana Capri as Carla
 Grae Fernandez as Timmy Ramos
 Jane Oineza as Cassie Ramos
 Manolo Pedrosa as Miguel Ramos
 Andrei Garcia as Adrian Ramos
 Ina Feleo as Joyce
 Kim Molina as Lindsay
 Alex Medina as Cedric
 Eda Nolan as Jane
 Miguel Faustman as Jaime
 Evangeline Pascual as Isabel
 Tetchie Agbayani as Wilma
 Khalil Ramos as Enzo
 Hannah Ledesma as Andrea

See also 
 List of Filipino films in 2015

References

External links 
 
 

2015 films
Philippine drama films
2015 drama films
2010s Tagalog-language films
Star Cinema films
Star Cinema drama films
2010s English-language films
Films directed by Nuel Crisostomo Naval